is a private university in Saitama, Saitama Prefecture, Japan, established in 2003. The predecessor of the school was founded in 1946.

External links
 Official website 

Educational institutions established in 1946
Private universities and colleges in Japan
Universities and colleges in Saitama Prefecture
1946 establishments in Japan